Introducing Ayiesha Woods is the debut album from contemporary Christian music artist Ayiesha Woods. It was released on June 6, 2006 through Gotee Records. The album was Grammy Award-nominated for "Best Pop/Contemporary Gospel Album" in 2007.  It was produced by Incorporated Elements, as well as Toby Mac.

Track listing
"Happy"
"The Remedy"
"Big Enough" (featuring tobyMac)
"Get To You"
"Crazy"
"What You Do To Me"
"Days"
"Beauty"
"The Greatest Artist"
"The Only One" (featuring Jason Eskridge)
"I Don't Mind"
"What Matters Most"

References

External links
Ayiesha Woods
Gotee Records

Gotee Records albums
2006 debut albums
Ayiesha Woods albums